Vito Volterra  (3 May 1860 – 11 October 1940) was an Italian mathematician and physicist, known for his contributions to mathematical biology and integral equations, being one of the founders of functional analysis.

Biography
Born in Ancona, then part of the Papal States, into a very poor Jewish family: his father was Abramo Volterra and his mother, Angelica Almagià. Abramo Volterra died in 1862 when Vito was two years old. The family moved to Turin, and then to Florence, where he studied at the Dante Alighieri Technical School and the Galileo Galilei Technical Institute. 

Volterra showed early promise in mathematics before attending the University of Pisa, where he fell under the influence of Enrico Betti, and where he became professor of rational mechanics in 1883. He immediately started work developing his theory of functionals which led to his interest and later contributions in integral and integro-differential equations. His work is summarised in his book Theory of functionals and of Integral and Integro-Differential Equations (1930).

In 1892, he became professor of mechanics at the University of Turin and then, in 1900, professor of mathematical physics at the University of Rome La Sapienza. Volterra had grown up during the final stages of the Risorgimento when the Papal States were finally annexed by Italy and, like his mentor Betti, he was an enthusiastic patriot, being named by the king Victor Emmanuel III as a senator of the Kingdom of Italy in 1905. In the same year, he began to develop the theory of dislocations in crystals that was later to become important in the understanding of the behaviour of ductile materials. On the outbreak of World War I, already well into his 50s, he joined the Italian Army and worked on the development of airships under Giulio Douhet. He originated the idea of using inert helium rather than flammable hydrogen and made use of his leadership abilities in organising its manufacture. 

After World War I, Volterra turned his attention to the application of his mathematical ideas to biology, principally reiterating and developing the work of Pierre François Verhulst. An outcome of this period is the Lotka–Volterra equations.

Volterra is the only person who was a plenary speaker in the International Congress of Mathematicians four times (1900, 1908, 1920, 1928).

In 1922, he joined the opposition to the Fascist regime of Benito Mussolini and in 1931 he was one of only 12 out of 1,250 professors who refused to take a mandatory oath of loyalty. His political philosophy can be seen from a postcard he sent in the 1930s, on which he wrote what can be seen as an epitaph for Mussolini's Italy: Empires die, but Euclid’s theorems keep their youth forever. However, Volterra was no radical firebrand; he might have been equally appalled if the leftist opposition to Mussolini had come to power, since he was a lifelong royalist and nationalist. As a result of his refusal to sign the oath of allegiance to the fascist government he was compelled to resign his university post and his membership of scientific academies, and, during the following years, he lived largely abroad, returning to Rome just before his death.

In 1936, he had been appointed a member of the Pontifical Academy of Sciences, on the initiative of founder Agostino Gemelli.

He died in Rome on 11 October 1940. He is buried in the Ariccia Cemetery. The Academy organised his funeral.

Family

In 1900 he married Virginia Almagia, a cousin. Their son Edoardo Volterra (1904–1984) was a famous historian of Roman law.

Volterra also had a daughter, Luisa Volterra, who married Umberto d'Ancona. D'Ancona piqued his father-in-law's interest in biomathematics when he showed Vito a set of data regarding populations of different species of fish on the Adriatic Sea, where decreased fishing activity from the war had led to an increase in the populations of predatory fish species. Vito published an analysis of the dynamics of interacting species of fish the next year.

Selected writings by Volterra
 1912. The theory of permutable functions. Princeton University Press.
 1913. Leçons sur les fonctions de lignes. Paris: Gauthier-Villars.
 1912. Sur quelques progrès récents de la physique mathématique. Clark University.
 1913. Leçons sur les équations intégrales et les équations intégro-différentielles. Paris: Gauthier-Villars.
 1926, "Variazioni e fluttuazioni del numero d'individui in specie animali conviventi," Mem. R. Accad. Naz. dei Lincei 2: 31–113.
 1926, "Fluctuations in the abundance of a species considered mathematically," Nature 118: 558–60.
 1930. Theory of functionals and of integral and integro-differential equations. Blackie & Son.
 1931. Leçons sur la théorie mathématique de la lutte pour la vie. Paris: Gauthier-Villars. Reissued 1990, Gabay, J., ed.
 1936. with Joseph Pérès: 
 1938. with Bohuslav Hostinský: Opérations infinitésimales linéaires. Paris: Gauthier-Villars.
 1960. Sur les Distorsions des corps élastiques (with Enrico Volterra). Paris: Gauthier-Villars.
 1954-1962. Opere matematiche. Memorie e note. Vol. 1, 1954; Vol. 2, 1956; Vol. 3, 1957; Vol. 4, 1960; Vol. 5, 1962; Accademia dei Lincei.

See also

 Volterra (crater)
 Volterra's function
 Lotka–Volterra equation
 Smith–Volterra–Cantor set
 Volterra integral equation
 Volterra series
 Product integral
 Volterra operator
 Volterra space
 Volterra Semiconductor
 Poincaré lemma

Notes

Biographical references
.
. "Vito Volterra fifty years after his death" is detailed biographical survey paper on Vito Volterra, dealing mainly with scientific, philosophical and moral aspects of his personality.
. The commemorative address pronounced by Agostino Gemelli on the occasion of the first seance of the fourth academic year of Pontificial Academy of Sciences: it includes his commemoration of various deceased members.
. See also the review in American Scientist.
.
.
. The commemorative address by Carlo Somigliana, colleague and friend of Vito Volterra.

General references
. In this paper Luigi Accardi describes the early research work of Vito Volterra on functionals, leading to the creation of functional analysis.
.
. "The work of Vito Volterra on hereditary phenomena and some of their consequences" is an ample technical survey paper on the research work of Vito Volterra on hereditary phenomena in mathematical physics.

.
.

External links

 
 Gustavo Colonnetti e le origini dell'ingegneria in Italia, Fausto Giovannardi
 
 

1860 births
1940 deaths
People from Ancona
20th-century Italian Jews
Jewish physicists
19th-century Italian physicists
Mathematical analysts
Mathematical physicists
Functional analysts
Mathematical and theoretical biology
University of Pisa alumni
Academic staff of the Sapienza University of Rome
Members of the Senate of the Kingdom of Italy
19th-century Italian mathematicians
20th-century Italian mathematicians
Members of the Pontifical Academy of Sciences
Foreign Members of the Royal Society
Foreign associates of the National Academy of Sciences
Corresponding members of the Saint Petersburg Academy of Sciences
Corresponding Members of the Russian Academy of Sciences (1917–1925)
Corresponding Members of the USSR Academy of Sciences
Honorary Members of the USSR Academy of Sciences
Academic staff of the University of Turin
20th-century Italian politicians
Academic staff of the University of Pisa
19th-century Italian Jews
20th-century Italian physicists